LG Pay was a mobile payment and digital wallet service by LG Electronics that let users make payments using compatible phones. The service supported contactless payments using near-field communications (NFC), but also incorporated wireless magnetic communication that allowed contactless payments to be used on payment terminals that only supported magnetic stripe transactions.

Service 
LG Pay was developed from the intellectual property of Dynamics and has announced plans since November 2015. The service supports both NFC-based mobile payment systems (which are prioritized when support is detected), as well as those that only support magnetic stripes. This is accomplished via technology known as "Wireless Magnetic Communication" (WMC), which transmits card data to a payment terminal's swipe slot via emitting wireless magnetic data pulses, causing the terminal to register it as if it were a normal magnetic stripe.

On phones, the menu of the wallet was launched by swiping from the bottom of the screen. Different credit, debit and loyalty cards can be loaded into the app, and selected by swiping between them on-screen.

In South Korea, LG Pay could be used for online store payments, transportation card payments, membership cards, and to withdraw money on selected banks' ATMs.

Security 
LG Pay's security measures were based on LG Mobile and South Korean card companies such as Shinhan Card technologies; credit card information is stored in a secure token. Payments had to be authenticated using either a one-time password, fingerprint scan, or later on using 3D facial recognition .

See also
Magnetic secure transmission
Apple Pay
Google Pay
Microsoft Pay
Samsung Pay
KakaoPay
Naver Pay

References

LG Electronics products
Mobile payments in the United States
Mobile payments in South Korea